Frederick William, Prince von Hessenstein (17 March 1735, Stockholm — 27 July 1808, Panker), was a Swedish soldier and statesman. He was an extramarital son of King Frederick I of Sweden and his royal mistress Hedvig Taube.

Biography

King Gustav III treated him with great respect. He was appointed Field Marshal in 1773, Privy Councillor in 1776, and Governor-General of Pomerania between 1776 and 1791. Hessenstein was made a count of the Holy Roman Empire (in which his father's German realm, the landgraviate of Hesse-Kassel, was located) on 28 February 1741, and created a Swedish count on 29 March of the following year. He was elevated to Prince von Hessenstein in the Empire in November 1772, and hereditary Prince von Hessenstein also in Sweden on 28 April 1785. In 1773, he was also made one of the Lords of the Realm.

According to unverified rumors, he might have been the father of an extramarital daughter by Princess Sofia Albertina, Gustav III's sister. Named Sophia, she was allegedly born in 1786, a year before the princess was sent to Germany as Abbess of Quedlinburg.

Honors

Knight of the Royal Order of the Seraphim
Commander of the Royal Order of the Sword

References

Other sources
Lindquist,  Herman  (2002) Historien om Sverige. Gustavs dagar  (Norstedts Förlag) )
Lagerqvist, Lars O.  (1976) Sveriges regenter - från forntid till nutid (Bonnier) 

1735 births
1808 deaths
People from Plön (district)
Illegitimate children of Swedish monarchs
Field marshals of Sweden
Governors-General of Sweden
Swedish Pomerania
Swedish nobility
Swedish people of German descent
18th-century Swedish military personnel
Commanders of the Order of the Sword
Sons of kings